The Almost Big Band was a 13 piece jazz band formed by Ernie Wilkins in 1980 after his permanent move to Copenhagen, Denmark. Members included expatriate American such as Kenny Drew and Ed Thigpen as well as prominent Danish jazz musicians such as Jesper Thilo and Bent Jaedig.

Mainly an arranger, Wilkins created the band so he could write for a band of his own formation. In America the band remained underrated and overlooked.

Current members
 Benny Rosenfeld, lead trumpet
 Mårten Lundgren, trumpet
 Gerard Presencer, trumpet
 Vincent Nilsson, lead trombone
 Kim Aagaard, trombone
 Jan zum Vohrde, lead alto
 Pernille Bévort, tenor saxophone
 Jan Harbeck, tenor saxophone
 Jesper Løvdal, baritone sax, bandleader
 Nikolaj Bentzon, piano
 Jesper Lundgaard, bass
 Aage Tanggaard, drums

Past members
 Jesper Thilo, tenor saxophone
 Jens Winther, trumpet
 Erling Kroner, trombone
 Bent Jædig tenor saxophone
 Tim Hagans, trumpeter
 Kenny Drew, piano
 Ed Thigpen, drums

Discography
 Ernie Wilkins & the Almost Big Band (Storyville, 1980)
 Almost Big Band Live (Matrix Music Marketing, 1981)
 Montreux (SteepleChase, 1983)
 On the Roll (SteepleChase, 1984)

References

Big bands
Danish jazz ensembles
Musical groups established in 1980